Parroquia (pl. parroquias; , pl. parroquies) or Parròquia (pl. parròquies) is a term equivalent to the English Parish; used in Andorra, Ecuador, Venezuela, Peru and some parts of northwestern Spain.

It can be found in the following countries:
Parròquia (Andorra)
Parroquia (Ecuador)
Parroquia (Spain)
Parroquia (Venezuela)

References

External links
 Asociación de Gobiernos Parroquiales Rurales del Azuay 
 Nomenclator - notas metodológicas Sociedad Asturiana de Estudios Económicos e Industriales 

Types of administrative division
Civil parishes

ca:Parròquia
es:Parroquia
eu:Parrokia